Phnom Chisor ("Chisor Mountain") is a 133-metres high mountain in Dok Por village, Rovieng commune, Samraŏng District, Takéo Province, Cambodia. It lies about 42 km south of Phnom Penh. The Ministry of Culture and Fine Art are preparing documents to nominate the site in the list of UNESCO world heritage.

Temple: Prasat Phnom Chisor
There is an ancient Khmer temple, Prasat Phnom Chisor (or Phnom Chisor Temple, sometimes referred to just Phnom Chisor) located on top of the hill.
The temple was built in the 11th century of laterite and bricks with carved sandstone lintels  by the Khmer Empire king Suryavarman I,  who practiced Brahmanism. It was dedicated to the Hindu divinities Shiva and Vishnu. The original name of the temple was Sri Suryaparvata, or The Mountain of Surya[varman] (The mountain of the Sun).

On the east edge of the mountain, at the back of the temple, there is a prime spot for view and pictures where you can see a vast plain of surrounding rice fields and countryside.
From there, looking down to the east can see an avenue that forms a straight line connecting three main features including two outer gates (temples) of cruciform ground plan and a baray:
 Sen Nimol Temple: now heavily grown, situated just below the mountain;
 Sen Roveang Temple: a stately building now used as a Buddhist sanctuary about 800m from Sen Nimol Temple;
 Tonle Om: the ancient baray of Phnom Chisor Temple.

References

External links
 Angkor Guide - Phnom Chisor
 Angkor Temple Guide: Phnom Chisor
 Indra at Phnom Chisor
Phnom Chisor Mountain Temple

Buildings and structures completed in the 11th century
Buildings and structures in Takéo province
Hindu temples in Cambodia
Chisor
Angkorian sites in Takéo Province